V. Manuel Rocha (born 1950) is an American diplomat and former United States Ambassador to Bolivia.

Background
Rocha was born in 1950. He graduated from Taft School in 1969, where he was captain of the soccer team, and graduated  from Yale University cum laude in 1973. He received a master's degree in public administration from Harvard University in 1976 and a Master of Arts in international relations from Georgetown University in 1978.

Rocha began his career in November 1981, serving as a desk officer for Honduras with the United States Department of State. In January 1983, he was appointed as a Political Officer for the U.S. Embassy in Santo Domingo, Dominican Republic. He went on to serve as a Watch Officer in the Operations Center of the Department of State and as a Consul for Political and Economic Affairs for the U.S. Consulate General in Florence, Italy. In March 1987, he was appointed Politico-Military officer for the U.S. Embassy in Tegucigalpa, Honduras.

Rocha also has served as Deputy Principal Officer of the U.S. Interests Section in Havana, Cuba, as well as the Director for Inter-American Affairs at the National Security Council in Washington, D.C. From November 1991 until June 1994, Rocha was the Deputy Chief of Mission for the U.S. Embassy in Santo Domingo, Dominican Republic. Prior to that, he was Deputy Political Counselor for the U.S. Embassy in Mexico City, Mexico. After October 1997, he served as Chargé d'affaires at the U.S. Embassy in Buenos Aires, Argentina. From July to October 1997, he was the Deputy Chief of Mission at the Embassy.

Ambassadorship to Bolivia
Manuel Rocha was sworn in as United States Ambassador to Bolivia on July 14, 2000 and presented his credentials to the President of Bolivia on August 4, 2000. He made a remark about Washington cutting off aid to the country over support for coca growers movement in the country, which has been credited with giving Evo Morales a surge of support in the presidential election in 2002.

Rocha ended his term on August 7, 2002.

Career after leaving the Foreign Service
Rocha is a member of the Council on Foreign Relations in New York. He serves on the University of Miami's International Advisory Board. He has also been a member of Henry Kissinger's International Council on Terrorism and has served on the advisory board of the Cuba Transition Project of the University of Miami. He is a special advisor to the U.S. military commander of SOUTHCOM. He was Director of Government Relations for Arcos Dorados Holdings, the company that owns and manages most of the McDonald's restaurants in Latin America. He is currently Senior Advisor on International Business for American law firm Foley & Lardner LLP, with his office in Miami, and president of Barrick Gold Corp. Pueblo Viejo, in the Dominican Republic.

References 

 This article was based on the public domain US State Department biography at https://2001-2009.state.gov/r/pa/ei/biog/1927.htm

1950 births
Living people
Ambassadors of the United States to Bolivia
Taft School alumni
Georgetown University alumni
Harvard Kennedy School alumni
Yale University alumni
United States Foreign Service personnel
20th-century American diplomats
21st-century American diplomats